Saurauia latibractea is a species of plant in the family Annonaceae. It is native to The Philippines.  Jacques Denys Choisy, the Swiss botanist who first formally described the species, named it after its broad (latus in Latin) bracts.  In Maranao it is called maragaoaq or tamiagau.

Description
It is a tree with oval or elliptical leaves that come to a point at their tip.  Its leaf margins are serrate.  Its flowers are axillary.  Its sepals are white.

Reproductive biology
The pollen of S. elegans is shed as permanent tetrads.

References

External links
 

latibractea
Flora of the Philippines
Plants described in 1854
Taxa named by Jacques Denys Choisy